Kusari gusoku (chain armour)(鎖具足) is the Japanese term for mail armour. Kusari is a type of armour used by the samurai class and their retainers in feudal Japan. When the word kusari is used in conjunction with an armoured item it usually means that the kusari makes up the majority of the armour defence.

History and description

The Japanese had more varieties of mail than all the rest of the world put together.  Kusari was used in samurai armour at least from the time of the Mongol invasions (1270s) but particularly from the Nanboku-chō period (1336–1392). Kusari was typically made with rings that were much smaller than their European counterparts, and patches of kusari were used to link together plates and to drape over vulnerable areas such as the underarm.  Most common parts of samurai armour could be made with kusari as the main armour defense as well as many types of garments including jackets, hoods, gloves, vests, shin, shoulder, thigh guards, even kusari tabi socks. Kusari gusoku (chain armour) was commonly used during the Edo period 1603 to 1868 as a stand-alone defense. According to George Cameron Stone, "Entire suits of mail kusari gusoku were worn on occasions, sometimes under the ordinary clothing".During most of the Edo period, traditional armour was for the most part relegated to ceremonial use and as a display of wealth, power, class and rank, while lightweight portable armour and armoured clothing such as tatami armour and kusari karabira were still in use. While large battles were a thing of the past, revolts, peasant uprisings, clan conflicts, individual duels, assassination attempts etc. ensured that samurai still needed some kind of armour protection. Edo period samurai police officers (machi-kata doshin) wore kusari garments for protection when making an arrest, and Ian Bottomley in his book Arms and Armor of the Samurai: The History of Weaponry in Ancient Japan shows a picture of a kusari armour and mentions kusari katabira (chain jackets) with detachable arms being worn by samurai police officials during the Edo period. The end of the samurai era in the 1860s, along with the 1876 ban on wearing swords in public, marked the end of any practical use for mail and other armour in Japan. Japan turned to a conscription army and uniforms replaced armour.

Types of kusari
The Japanese used many different weave methods including: a square 4-in-1 pattern (so gusari), a hexagonal 6-in-1 pattern (hana gusari) and a European 4-in-1 (nanban gusari), the kusari links could be doubled up and some examples were tripled in a possible attempt to make the kusari bullet resistant. The links were lacquered black to prevent rusting, and were always stitched onto a backing of cloth or leather. The kusari was sometimes concealed entirely between layers of cloth.

Riveted links
Riveted kusari was known and used in Japan. In the book Japanese Arms & Armor Introduction by H. Russell Robinson, there is a picture of Japanese riveted kusari on page 58.
This quote from the translated reference of Sakakibara Kozan's 1800 book, The Manufacture of Armour and Helmets in Sixteenth Century Japan, shows that the Japanese not only knew of and used riveted kusari but that they manufactured it as well.

"… karakuri-namban (riveted namban), with stout links each closed by a rivet. Its invention is credited to Fukushima Dembei Kunitaka, pupil, of Hojo Awa no Kami Ujifusa, but it is also said to be derived directly from foreign models. It is heavy because the links are tinned (biakuro-nagashi) and these are also sharp edged because they are punched out of iron plate".

Riveted links

Butted or split/twisted links
Butted and or split (twisted) links made up the majority of kusari links used by the Japanese. Links were either butted together meaning that the ends touched each other and were not riveted, or the kusari was constructed with links where the wire was turned or twisted two or more times. These twisted links are similar to the modern split ring commonly used on key chains. Twisted links always connected to a center butted link. Both butted and twisted links could be used on the same armour item with butted links covering certain areas and twisted links on another.

Butted links

Twisted links

Kusari examples
Kusari was commonly used to connect the armour plates on the sangu (three extremity armours), the haidate (thigh armour), suneate (shin armour), and kote (armored sleeves), the armour for these items could also be composed almost entirely of kusari. Kusari was also used to connect the armour plates on many types of tatami armour. Kusari could also be used as the main armour for the dou/dō (chest armour), for the kusazuri (tassets) of the dou/dō and on the sode (shoulder armour). Many types of Japanese auxiliary armours used kusari in their construction or as the mail armour defense. Kusari katabira (chain armour jackets) were a common armour item as well as kusari zukin (chain armour hoods). Shikoro (neck guards) on kabuto (helmets) and hachi gane (forehead protectors) could have kusari as the mail armour defense.

See also
 Japanese armour
 Karuta (Japanese armour)
 Kikko (Japanese armour)
 Mail (armour)
 Tatami (Japanese armour)

References

External links

Anthony Bryant's online Japanese armour manual

Samurai armour